The Pieds-Noirs (Pied-Noir), are the people of French and other European descent who were born in Algeria during the period of French rule from 1830 to 1962; the vast majority of whom departed for mainland France as soon as Algeria gained independence  or in the months following.

From the French invasion on 18 June 1830 until its independence, Algeria was administratively part of France; its European population were simply called Algerians or colons (colonists), whereas the Muslim people of Algeria were called Arabs, Muslims or Indigenous. The term "pied-noir" began to be commonly used shortly before the end of the Algerian War in 1962.

As of the last census in French-ruled Algeria, taken on 1 June 1960, there were 1,050,000 non-Muslim civilians (mostly Catholic, but including 130,000 Algerian Jews) in Algeria, 10 per cent of the population.

During the Algerian War a vast majority of Pieds-Noirs were loyalists and overwhelmingly supported colonial French rule in Algeria and were opposed to Algerian nationalist groups such as the Front de libération nationale (English: National Liberation Front) (FLN) and Mouvement national algérien (English: Algerian National Movement) (MNA). The roots of the conflict lay in political and economic inequalities perceived as an "alienation" from the French rule as well as a demand for a leading position for the Berber, Arab and Islamic cultures and rules existing before the French conquest. The conflict contributed to the fall of the French Fourth Republic and the exodus of European and Jewish Algerians to France.

After Algeria became independent in 1962, about 800,000 Pieds-Noirs of French nationality were evacuated to mainland France, while about 200,000 remained in Algeria. Of the latter, there were still about 100,000 in 1965, about 50,000 by the end of the 1960s and 30,000 in 1993. In recent years, smaller numbers of Pieds-Noirs or those of Pied-Noir descent have returned to Algeria.

Those who moved to France suffered ostracism from left-wing political movements for their perceived exploitation of native Muslims, while others blamed them for the war and thus for the political turmoil surrounding the collapse of the Fourth Republic. In popular culture, the community is often represented as feeling removed from French culture while longing for Algeria. Thus, the recent history of the Pieds-Noirs has been characterized by a sense of twofold alienation, on the one hand from the land of their birth and on the other from their adopted homeland. Though the term rapatriés d'Algérie implies that prior to Algeria they once lived in France, most Pieds-Noirs were born in Algeria.

Etymology

There are competing theories about the origin of the term "pied-noir". According to the Oxford English Dictionary, it refers to "a person of European origin living in Algeria during the period of French rule, especially a French person expatriated after Algeria was granted independence in 1962." The Le Robert dictionary states that in 1901 the word indicated a sailor working barefoot in the coal room of a ship, who would find his feet blackened by the soot and dust. Since, in the Mediterranean, this was often an Algerian native, the term was used pejoratively for Algerians until 1955 when it first began referring to "French born in Algeria" according to some sources. The Oxford English Dictionary claims this usage originated from mainland French as a negative nickname.

There is also a theory that the term comes from the black boots of French soldiers compared to the barefoot Algerians. Other theories focus on new settlers dirtying their clothing by working in swampy areas, wearing black boots when on horseback, or trampling grapes to make wine.

History

French conquest and settlement

European settlement of Algeria began during the 1830s, after France had commenced the process of conquest with the military seizure of the city of Algiers in 1830. The invasion was instigated when the Dey of Algiers struck the French consul with a fly-swatter in 1827, although economic reasons are also cited. In 1830 the government of King Charles X blockaded Algeria and an armada sailed to Algiers, followed by a land expedition. Following a three-week campaign, the Hussein Dey capitulated on 5 July 1830 and was exiled.

In the 1830s the French controlled only the northern part of the country. Entering the Oran region, they faced resistance from Emir Abd al-Kader, a leader of a Sufi Brotherhood. In 1839 Abd al-Kader began a seven-year war by declaring jihad against the French. The French signed two peace treaties with Al-Kader, but they were broken because of a miscommunication between the military and the government in Paris. In response to the breaking of the second treaty, Abd al-Kader drove the French to the coast. In reply, a force of nearly 100,000 troops marched to the Algerian countryside and forced Abd al-Kader's surrender in 1847.

In 1848 Algeria was divided into three departments (Alger, Oran and Constantine), thus becoming part of France.

The French modeled their colonial system on their predecessors, the Ottomans, by co-opting local tribes. In 1843 the colonists began supervising through bureaux arabes operated by military officials with authority over particular domains. This system lasted until the 1880s and the rise of the French Third Republic, when colonisation intensified. Large-scale regrouping of lands began when land-speculation companies took advantage of government policy that allowed massive sale of native property. By the 20th century Europeans held 1,700,000 hectares; by 1940,  2,700,000 hectares, about 35 to 40 percent; and by 1962 it was 2,726,700 hectares representing 27 percent of the arable land of Algeria. Settlers came from all over the western Mediterranean region, particularly Italy, France, Spain and Malta.

Identity

In Metropolitan France, Algeria was considered an integral part of French national territory and this sentiment was largely shared by the Pied-Noir community.

The end of the French protectorate of Tunisia and of the French protectorate in Morocco in 1956 led to mass emigration of French people from the former colonies. These two countries had been placed under protectorate whereas Algeria and its population fell under territory status and were considered part of overseas France.

In reaction to the first FLN attacks marking the start of the Algerian war in 1954, Pierre Mendès France, President of the Council addressing the French National Assembly expressed the distinction between the political status of Algeria compared to Tunisia and Morocco:

We do not compromise when it comes to defending the internal peace of the nation, the unity, the integrity of the Republic. The departments of Algeria constitute a part of the French Republic. They have been French for a long time and irrevocably. Their populations, who enjoy French citizenship and are represented in Parliament, have moreover given in peace, as before in war, enough proof of their attachment to France for France, in its turn, not to allow in question this unit. Between them and the metropolis, there is no conceivable secession. Never France, no government, no French Parliament, whatever their particular tendencies, will ever yield on this fundamental principle. I affirm that no comparison with Tunisia or Morocco is more false, more dangerous. Here it is France."

As the colony of Algeria grew with each generation, Pied-Noirs began to define themselves as distinct from that of French citizens from metropolitan France and considered themselves as Algerian people. Some pied-noirs considered themselves at one time to be "true Algerians" whereas Muslim Algerians were termed as "Indigenous" peoples. An exchange between a Pied-Noir student from Algiers and a metropolitan French student was recoded during a UNEF conference was recorded in 1922:

"So you're Algerian… but the son of a Frenchman, aren't you?"
"Of course! All Algerians are sons of the French, the others are natives."

However, many Pied-Noirs avoided using the term after the Second World War so as not to be confused with indigenous Algerian migrant workers who went to France. The Pied-Noirs themselves also used several nicknames to designate the French in metropolitan France, such as French from France, Frangaoui, Patos and sometimes Pied-Blanc (white feet).

Other terms used internally within the Pied-Noir population included Pied-Rouge (Red-Foot) to refer to Pied-Noir members of the Algerian Communist Party or those who held left-wing beliefs, including a minority of Pied-Noirs sympathetic to the independence movement. The term Pied-Gris was used to refer both to children with parentage from both metropolitan France and French Algeria, and to French settlers from independent Tunisia and Morocco who moved to French Algeria in the late 1950s instead of France. French writer René Domergue noted that Pied-Gris was used by both French settlers from Tunisia and Morocco and the Pied-Noirs themselves to disguinsh themselves from each other.

Culture, food and language
French writer Léon Isnard noted that Pied-Noirs often mixed traditional French and occasionally Spanish and Italian cuisine with local Arab and Jewish influences. Dishes such as gazpacho, paella, méchoui and brochette skewered meat were commonly consumed by the Pied-Noir population and often accompanied with white wine produced by Pied-Noir farmers in Tlemcen and red wine from  Mascara.

Although French was the main dialect of the Pied-Noirs, a distinct form of French known as  “pataouète” was developed by the Pied-Noir community in Algeria and contained words, idioms, expressions and slang terms not commonly found in Metropolitan France. Ferdinand Duchene noted that “pataouète” was largely derived from mainland French but contained words from Spanish and Catalan (influenced by Spanish workers in Algerian during the late 1800s), as well as Italian and local Arab and Hebrew dialect.

Social structure
Like other white populations in colonial era Africa, the Pieds-Noirs generally dominated much of Algeria's industrial, cultural and political institutions, making up the most influential section of society. However, French Algeria also attracted laborers, blue collar and agricultural workers from metropolitan France, Spain, Italy and Malta in search of better economic opportunities. European manual laborers came under the Pied-Noir fold and acquired French nationality after several years of living in Algeria. As such, the Pieds-Noir community contained different social classes and structures within itself. Following the exodus to France in the aftermath of the Algerian war, working class Pieds-Noirs were particularly scathing of accusations from the French political left that they were exploiters or elite colonialists over the indigenous population.

Relationship to mainland France and Muslim Algeria

The Pied-Noir relationship with France and Algeria was marked by alienation. The settlers considered themselves French, but many of the Pieds-Noirs had a tenuous connection to mainland France, which 28 percent of them had never visited. The settlers encompassed a range of socioeconomic strata, ranging from peasants to large landowners, the latter of whom were referred to as grands colons.

In Algeria, the Muslims were not considered French and did not share the same political or economic benefits. For example, the indigenous population did not own most of the settlements, farms, or businesses, although they numbered nearly nine million (versus roughly one million Pieds-Noirs) at independence. Politically, the Muslim Algerians had no representation in the French National Assembly until 1945 and wielded limited influence in local governance. To obtain citizenship, they were required to renounce their Muslim identity. Since this would constitute apostasy, only about 2,500 Muslims acquired citizenship before 1930. The settlers' politically and economically dominant position worsened relations between the two groups.

The Pied-Noir population as part of the total Algerian population

From roughly the last half of the 19th century until independence, the Pieds-Noirs accounted for approximately 10% of the total Algerian population.  Although they constituted a numerical minority, they were undoubtedly the prime political and economic force of the region.

In 1959, the Pieds-Noirs numbered 1,025,000, and accounted for 10.4% of the total population of Algeria, a percentage gradually diminishing since the peak of 15.2% in 1926. However, some areas of Algeria had high concentrations of Pieds-Noirs, such as the regions of Bône (now Annaba), Algiers, and above all the area from Oran to Sidi-Bel-Abbès. Oran had been under European rule since the 16th century (1509); the population in the Oran metropolitan area was 49.3% European and Jewish in 1959.

In the Algiers metropolitan area, Europeans and Jewish people accounted for 35.7% of the population. In the metropolitan area of Bône they accounted for 40.5% of the population. The département of Oran, a rich European-developed agricultural land of 16,520 km2 (6,378 sq. miles) stretching between the cities of Oran and Sidi-Bel-Abbès, and including them, was the area of highest Pied-Noir density outside of the cities, with the Pieds-Noirs accounting for 33.6% of the population of the département in 1959.

Sephardic Jewish community

Jews were present in North Africa and Iberia for centuries, some since the time when "Phoenicians and Hebrews, engaged in maritime commerce, founded Hippo Regius (current Annaba), Tipasa, Caesarea (current Cherchel), and Icosium (current Algiers)". According to oral tradition they arrived from Judea after the First Jewish-Roman War (66–73 AD), while it is known historically that many Sephardi Jews came following the Spanish Reconquista. In 1870, Justice Minister Adolphe Crémieux wrote a proposal, décret Crémieux, giving French citizenship to Algerian Jews. This advancement was resisted by part of the larger Pied-Noir community and in 1897 a wave of anti-Semitic riots occurred in Algeria. During World War II the décret Crémieux was abolished under the Vichy regime, and Jews were barred from professional jobs between 1940 and 1943. Citizenship was restored in 1943, after the Free French took control over Algeria in the wake of Operation Torch. Thus, the Jews of Algeria eventually came to be considered part of the Pied-Noir community, and many fled the country to France in 1962, alongside most other Pieds-Noirs, after the Algerian War.

Algerian War and exodus

Algerian War

For more than a century France maintained colonial rule in Algerian territory. This allowed exceptions to republican law, including Sharia laws applied by Islamic customary courts to Muslim women which gave women certain rights to property and inheritance that they did not have under French law. Discontent among the Muslim Algerians grew after the World Wars, in which the Algerians sustained many casualties. Algerian nationalists began efforts aimed at furthering equality by listing complaints in the Manifesto of the Algerian People, which requested equal representation under the state and access to citizenship, but no equality for all citizens to preserve Islamic precepts. The French response was to grant citizenship to 60,000 "meritorious" Muslims. During a reform effort in 1947, the French laws were changed to give the former French subjects with the legal status of "indigenes" full French legal citizenship.  The French created an Algerian Assembly, a form of bicameral legislature, with limited powers, and two chambers, one for those who were French citizens before 1947, and another for all the others who had only just become French citizens; but given the equal numbers of members in each chamber this meant that one group's votes had seven times more weight than the other group's. Paramilitary groups such as the National Liberation Front (Front de Libération nationale, FLN) appeared, claiming an Arab-Islamic brotherhood and state. This led to the outbreak of a war for independence, the Algerian War, in 1954.

From the first armed operations of November 1954, Pied-Noir civilians had always been targets for the FLN, either by assassination; bombing bars and cinemas; mass massacres; torture; and rapes in farms.
At the onset of the war, the Pieds-Noirs believed the French military would be able to overcome opposition. In May 1958 a demonstration for French Algeria, led by Pieds-Noirs but including many Muslims, occupied an Algerian government building.  Plots to overthrow the Fourth Republic, some including metropolitan French politicians and generals, had been swirling in Algeria for some time. General Jacques Massu controlled the riot by forming a 'Committee of Public Safety' demanding that his acquaintance Charles de Gaulle be named president of the French Fourth Republic, to prevent the "abandonment of Algeria". This eventually led to the fall of the Republic. In response, the French Parliament voted 329 to 224 to place de Gaulle in power. Once de Gaulle assumed leadership, he attempted peace by visiting Algeria within three days of his appointment, proclaiming "French Algeria!"; but in September 1959 he planned a referendum for Algerian self-determination that passed overwhelmingly. Many French political and military leaders in Algeria viewed this as a betrayal and formed the Organisation armée secrète (OAS) that had much support among Pieds-Noirs. This paramilitary group began attacking officials representing de Gaulle's authority, Muslims, and de Gaulle himself. The OAS was also accused of murders and bombings which nullified any remaining reconciliation opportunities between the communities, while Pieds-Noirs themselves never believed such reconciliation possible as their community was targeted from the start.

The opposition culminated in the Algiers putsch of 1961, led by retired generals. After its failure, on 18 March 1962, de Gaulle and the FLN signed a cease-fire agreement, the Évian Accords, and held a referendum. In July, Algerians voted 5,975,581 to 16,534 to become independent from France.
This triggered a massacre of Pieds-Noirs in Oran by a suburban Muslim population. European people were shot, raped, lynched and brought to Petit-Lac slaughterhouse where they were tortured and executed.

Exodus

The exodus began once it became clear that Algeria would become independent. In Algiers, it was reported that by May 1961 the Pieds-Noirs'  morale had sunk because of violence and allegations that the entire community of French nationals had been responsible for "terrorism, torture, colonial racism, and ongoing violence in general" and because the group felt "rejected by the nation as Pieds-Noirs ". These factors, the Oran Massacre, and the referendum for independence caused the Pied-Noir exodus to begin in earnest.

The number of Pieds-Noirs who fled Algeria totalled more than 800,000 between 1962 and 1964. Many Pieds-Noirs left only with what they could carry in a suitcase. Adding to the confusion, the de Gaulle government ordered the French Navy not to help with transportation of French citizens. By September 1962, cities such as Oran, Bône, and Sidi Bel Abbès were half-empty. All administration-, police-, school-, justice-, and commercial activities stopped within three months after many Pieds-Noirs were told to choose either "la valise ou le cercueil" (the suitcase or the coffin). 200,000 Pieds-Noirs chose to remain, but they gradually left through the following decades; by the 1980s only a few thousand Pieds-Noirs remained in Algeria.

Along with the exodus of the Pieds-Noirs, occurred the flight of the Muslim harki auxiliaries who had fought on the French side during the Algerian War. Of approximately 250,000 Muslim loyalists only about 90,000, including dependents, were able to escape to France; and of those who remained many thousands were killed by lynch mobs or executed as traitors by the FLN. In contrast to the treatment of the European Pieds-Noirs, little effort was made by the French government to extend protection to the harkis or to arrange their organised evacuation.

Flight to mainland France
The Government of France claimed that it had not anticipated that such a massive number would leave; it believed that perhaps 300,000 might choose to depart temporarily and that a large portion would return to Algeria. The administration had set aside funds for absorption of those it called repatriates to partly reimburse them for property losses. The administration avoided acknowledging the true numbers of refugees to avoid upsetting its Algeria policies. Consequently, few plans were made for their return, and, psychologically at least, many of the Pieds-Noirs were alienated from both Algeria and France.

Many Pieds-Noirs settled in continental France, while others migrated to New Caledonia, Australia, Spain, Israel, Argentina,  In France, many relocated to the south, which offered a climate similar to North Africa. The influx of new citizens bolstered the local economies; however, the newcomers also competed for jobs, which caused resentment. One unintended consequence with significant and ongoing political effects was the resentment caused by the state resettlement programme for Pieds-Noirs in rural Corsica, which triggered a cultural and political nationalist movement. In some ways, the Pieds-Noirs were able to integrate well into the French community, in particular relative to their harki Muslim counterparts. Their resettlement was made easier by the economic boom of the 1960s. However, the ease of assimilation depended on socioeconomic class. Integration was easier for the upper classes, many of whom found the transformation less stressful than the lower classes, whose only capital had been left in Algeria when they fled. Many were surprised at often being treated as an "underclass or outsider-group" with difficulties in gaining advancement in their careers. Also, many Pieds-Noirs contended that the money allocated by the government to assist in relocation and reimbursement was insufficient regarding their loss.

Thus, the repatriated Pieds-Noirs frequently felt "disaffected" from French society. They also suffered from a sense of alienation stemming from the French government's changed position towards Algeria. Until independence, Algeria was legally a part of France; after independence many felt that they had been betrayed and were now portrayed as an "embarrassment" to their country or to blame for the war. Most Pied-Noirs felt a powerful sense of loss and a longing for their lost homeland in Algeria. The American author Claire Messud remembered seeing her pied-noir father, a lapsed Catholic crying while watching Pope John Paul II deliver a Mass on his TV. When asked why, Messud père replied: "Because when I last heard the mass in Latin, I thought I had a religion, and I thought I had a country." Messud noted that the novelist Albert Camus, himself a pied-noir, had often written of his love for the sea-shores and mountains of Algeria, declaring Algeria was a place that was a part of his soul, feelings she noted mirrored those of other pied-noirs for whom Algeria was the only home they had ever known.

Pied-Noirs who remained
In the aftermath of the war, some Pied-Noirs chose to remain in Algeria with the Pied-Noir population recorded at standing around 200,000 in October 1962. This was found to have dropped to around 50,000 by 1965.

Under the Algerian Nationality Code of 1963, Pied-Noirs were permitted to obtain Algerian citizenship, but political reluctance by the FLN and the slowness of the process prompted some Pied-Noirs to emigrate over choosing citizenship. In 1965, it was believed over 500 European persons had applied for Algerian citizenship, with 200 having been born in Algeria.

In recent decades, it has been harder to determine the total population of Pied-Noir heritage in Algeria. In 1979, La Monde journalist Daniel Junqua put the population as being around 3,000. In 1993, French historian Hélène Bracco claimed the population to be higher at around 30,000 but were mostly elderly. Lingering political instability and events such as the Algerian civil war prompted many remaining Algerians of European descent to leave the country and apply for citizenship of France. The French Consulate in Algiers recorded that around 300 persons of European descent remain in the country, whereas an Algerian census company recorded the number as higher.

Etat Pied-Noir
In 2016, a group of Pied-Noir activists headed by Jacques Villard set up the Gouvernement provisoire Pied-Noir en exil (Provisional Government of the Pied-Noir in exile) in Montpellier in response to what they argued has been marginalization against the Pied-Noir community by successive governments in France. The movement has been referred to as Etat Pied-Noir and since 2022, some of its members call for the establishment of an autonomous Pied-Noir national territory in Algeria or the French mainland. Some commentators have drawn parallels with the Afrikanner Volkstaat movement in South Africa.

Flags

The Song of the Africans
The Pied-Noir community has adopted, as both an unofficial anthem and as a symbol of its identity, Captain Félix Boyer's 1943 version of "Le Chant des Africains" (lit. "The Song of the Africans"). This was a 1915 Infanterie de Marine marching song, originally titled "C'est nous les Marocains" (lit. "We are the Moroccans") and dedicated to Colonel Van Hecke, commander of a World War I cavalry unit: the 7e régiment de chasseurs d'Afrique ("7th African Light Cavalry Regiment"). Boyer's song was adopted during World War II by the Free French First Army that was drawn from units of the Army of Africa and included many Pieds-Noirs. The music and words were later utilized by the Pieds-Noirs to proclaim their allegiance to France. (listen to the Chant des Africains)

The "Song of the Africans" was banned from use as official military music in 1962 at the end of the Algerian War until August 1969, when the French Minister of Veterans Affairs (Ministre des Anciens Combattants) at the time, Henri Duvillard, lifted the prohibition.

Notable Pieds-Noirs

 Louis Althusser, philosopher
 Jacques Attali, economist, writer
 Paul Belmondo, sculptor, father of the actor Jean-Paul Belmondo
 Patrick Bokanowski, filmmaker
 Patrick Bruel, singer
 Albert Camus, Nobel Prize winning author and philosopher
 Claude Cohen-Tannoudji, Nobel laureate
 Étienne Daho, singer
 Jacques Derrida, philosopher
 Annie Fratellini, circus clown
 Tony Gatlif, filmmaker
 Marlène Jobert, actress and author
 Alphonse Juin, Marshal of France
 Marcel Cerdan, boxer
 Jean-François Larios, footballer
 Enrico Macias, singer
 Jean Pélégri, author
 Emmanuel Roblès, author
 Yves Saint Laurent, fashion designer

See also
Etat Pied-Noir
White Zimbabweans
Caldoche
Arab-Berber
Kouloughlis
European Moroccans
European Tunisians
Italian Tunisians
Turco-Tunisians
Italian settlers in Libya
French people
White Africans of European ancestry
White people in the Democratic Republic of the Congo
Retornados
List of French possessions and colonies

Further reading

 Eldridge, Claire; Kalter, Christoph; Taylor, Becky (2022). "Migrations of Decolonization, Welfare, and the Unevenness of Citizenship in the UK, France and Portugal". Past & Present.

References

Sources
 Ramsay, R. (1983) The Corsican Time-Bomb, Manchester University Press: Manchester. .

Jewish Algerian history
Ethnic groups in France
Ethnic groups in Algeria
Algerian War
French Algeria
Refugees in Africa
European diaspora in Africa
Refugees in France